Czeluścin may refer to:

Czeluścin, Gniezno County
Czeluścin, Gostyń County